Embryology (from Greek ἔμβρυον, embryon, "the unborn, embryo"; and -λογία, -logia) is the branch of animal biology that studies the prenatal development of gametes (sex cells), fertilization, and development of embryos and fetuses. Additionally, embryology encompasses the study of congenital disorders that occur before birth, known as teratology.

Early embryology was proposed by Marcello Malpighi, and known as preformationism, the theory that organisms develop from pre-existing miniature versions of themselves. Aristotle proposed the theory that is now accepted, epigenesis. Epigenesis is the idea that organisms develop from seed or egg in a sequence of steps. Modern embryology developed from the work of Karl Ernst von Baer, though accurate observations had been made in Italy by anatomists such as Aldrovandi and Leonardo da Vinci in the Renaissance.

Comparative embryology

Preformationism and epigenesis 
As recently as the 18th century, the prevailing notion in western human embryology was preformation: the idea that semen contains an embryo – a preformed, miniature infant, or homunculus – that simply becomes larger during development.

The competing explanation of embryonic development was epigenesis, originally proposed 2,000 years earlier by Aristotle. Much early embryology came from the work of the Italian anatomists Aldrovandi, Aranzio, Leonardo da Vinci, Marcello Malpighi, Gabriele Falloppio, Girolamo Cardano, Emilio Parisano, Fortunio Liceti, Stefano Lorenzini, Spallanzani, Enrico Sertoli, and Mauro Ruscóni. According to epigenesis, the form of an animal emerges gradually from a relatively formless egg. As microscopy improved during the 19th century, biologists could see that embryos took shape in a series of progressive steps, and epigenesis displaced preformation as the favored explanation among embryologists.

'CLEVAGE'
Cleavage is the very beginning steps of a developing embryo. Cleavage refers to the many mitotic divisions that occur after the egg is fertilized by the sperm. The ways in which the cells divide is specific to certain types of animals and may have many forms.

Holoblastic 
Holoblastic cleavage is the complete division of cells. Holoblastic cleavage can be radial (see: Radial cleavage), spiral (see: Spiral cleavage), bilateral (see: Bilateral cleavage), or rotational (see: Rotational cleavage). In holoblastic cleavage the entire egg will divide and become the embryo, whereas in meroblastic cleavage some cells will become the embryo and others will be the yolk sac.

Meroblastic 
Meroblastic cleavage is the incomplete division of cells. The division furrow does not protrude into the yolky region as those cells impede membrane formation and this causes the incomplete separation of cells. Meroblastic cleavage can be bilateral (see: Bilateral cleavage), discoidal (see: Discoidal cleavage), or centrolecithal (see: Centrolecithal).

Basal phyla 
Animals that belong to the basal phyla have holoblastic radial cleavage which results in radial symmetry (see: Symmetry in biology). During cleavage there is a central axis that all divisions rotate about. The basal phyla also has only one to two embryonic cell layers, compared to the three in bilateral animals (endoderm, mesoderm, and ectoderm).

Bilaterians 
In bilateral animals cleavage can be either holoblastic or meroblastic depending on the species. During gastrulation the blastula develops in one of two ways that divide the whole animal kingdom into two-halves (see: Embryological origins of the mouth and anus). If in the blastula the first pore, or blastopore, becomes the mouth of the animal, it is a protostome; if the blastopore becomes the anus then it is a deuterostome. The protostomes include most invertebrate animals, such as insects, worms and molluscs, while the deuterostomes include the vertebrates. In due course, the blastula changes into a more differentiated structure called the gastrula. Soon after the gastrula is formed, three distinct layers of cells (the germ layers) from which all the bodily organs and tissues then develop.

Germ layers 
 The innermost layer, or endoderm, give rise to the digestive organs, the gills, lungs or swim bladder if present, and kidneys or nephrites.
 The middle layer, or mesoderm, gives rise to the muscles, skeleton if any, and blood system.
 The outer layer of cells, or ectoderm, gives rise to the nervous system, including the brain, and skin or carapace and hair, bristles, or scales.

Drosophila melanogaster (fruit fly)
Drosophila have been used as a developmental model for many years. The studies that have been conducted have discovered many useful aspects of development that not only apply to fruit flies but other species as well.

Outlined below is the process that leads to cell and tissue differentiation.

 Maternal-effect genes help to define the anterior-posterior axis using Bicoid (gene) and Nanos (gene).
 Gap genes establish 3 broad segments of the embryo.
 Pair-rule genes define 7 segments of the embryo within the confines of the second broad segment that was defined by the gap genes.
 Segment-polarity genes define another 7 segments by dividing each of the pre-existing 7 segments into anterior and posterior halves using a gradient of Hedgehog and Wnt.
 Homeotic (Hox) genes use the 14 segments as pinpoints for specific types of cell differentiation and the histological developments that correspond to each cell type.

Humans
Humans are bilateral animals that have holoblastic rotational cleavage. Humans are also deuterostomes. In regard to humans, the term embryo refers to the ball of dividing cells from the moment the zygote implants itself in the uterus wall until the end of the eighth week after conception. Beyond the eighth week after conception (tenth week of pregnancy), the developing human is then called a fetus.

Evolutionary embryology 

Evolutionary embryology is the expansion of comparative embryology by the ideas of Charles Darwin. Similarly to Karl Ernst von Baer's principles that explained why many species often appear similar to one another in early developmental stages, Darwin argued that the relationship between groups can be determined based upon common embryonic and larval structures.

Von Baer's principles 

 The general features appear earlier in development than do the specialized features.
 More specialized characters develop from the more general ones.
 The embryo of a given species never resembles the adult form of a lower one.
 The embryo of a given species does resemble the embryonic form of a lower one.

Using Darwin's theory evolutionary embryologists have since been able to distinguish between homologous and analogous structures between varying species. Homologous structures are those that the similarities between them are derived from a common ancestor, such as the human arm and bat wings. Analogous structures are those that appear to be similar but have no common ancestral derivation.

Origins of modern embryology 
Until the birth of modern embryology through observation of the mammalian ovum by Karl Ernst von Baer in 1827, there was no clear scientific understanding of embryology, although later discussions in this article show that some cultures had a fairly refined understanding of some of the principles. Only in the late 1950s when ultrasound was first used for uterine scanning, was the true developmental chronology of human fetus available. Karl Ernst von Baer along with Heinz Christian Pander, also proposed the germ layer theory of development which helped to explain how the embryo developed in progressive steps. Part of this explanation explored why embryos in many species often appear similar to one another in early developmental stages using his four principles.

Modern embryology research 
Embryology is central to evolutionary developmental biology ("evo-devo"), which studies the genetic control of the development process (e.g. morphogens), its link to cell signalling, its roles in certain diseases and mutations, and its links to stem cell research. Embryology is the key to Gestational Surrogacy, which is when the sperm of the intended father and egg of intended mother are fused in a lab forming an embryo. This embryo is then put into the surrogate who carries the child to term.

Medical embryology 
Medical embryology is used widely to detect abnormalities before birth. 2-5% of babies are born with an observable abnormality and medical embryology explores the different ways and stages that these abnormalities appear in. Genetically derived abnormalities are referred to as malformations. When there are multiple malformations, this is considered a syndrome. When abnormalities appear due to outside contributors, these are disruptions. The outside contributors causing disruptions are known as teratogens. Common teratogens are alcohol, retinoic acid, ionizing radiation or hyperthermic stress.

Vertebrate and invertebrate embryology 
Many principles of embryology apply to invertebrates as well as to vertebrates. Therefore, the study of invertebrate embryology has advanced the study of vertebrate embryology. However, there are many differences as well. For example, numerous invertebrate species release a larva before development is complete; at the end of the larval period, an animal for the first time comes to resemble an adult similar to its parent or parents. Although invertebrate embryology is similar in some ways for different invertebrate animals, there are also countless variations. For instance, while spiders proceed directly from egg to adult form, many insects develop through at least one larval stage.
For decades, a number of so-called normal staging tables were produced for the embryology of particular species, mainly focussing on external developmental characters. As variation in developmental progress makes comparison among species difficult, a character-based Standard Event System was developed, which documents these differences and allows for phylogenetic comparisons among species.

Birth of developmental biology 
After the 1950s, with the DNA helical structure being unraveled and the increasing knowledge in the field of molecular biology, developmental biology emerged as a field of study which attempts to correlate the genes with morphological change, and so tries to determine which genes are responsible for each morphological change that takes place in an embryo, and how these genes are regulated.

As of today, human embryology is taught as a cornerstone subject in medical schools, as well as in biology and zoology programs at both an undergraduate and graduate level.

History

Ancient Egypt
The study of embryology has a long pedigree. Knowledge of the placenta goes back at least to ancient Egypt, where the placenta was viewed as the seat of the soul. There was even an Egyptian official who held the title Opener of the Kings Placenta. Furthermore, one Egyptian text from the time of Akhenaten claims that a human originates from the egg that grows in women.

Ancient India
A variety of conceptions on embryology appeared in ancient Asia. A more advanced understanding of the embryological process was known from ancient India. Descriptions of the amniotic sac appear in the Bhagavad Gita, Bhagavata Purana, and the Sushruta Samhita. For example, the Sushruta Samhita claims that an embryo emerges from semen and blood, both of which in turn find their origins in chyle. In the third month, differentiation of body parts such as arms, leg, and head occurs, and this is followed in the fourth month by the development of the heart, thorax, and abdomen. In the sixth month, the hair, bones, sinews, nails, and veins develop, and in the eighth month the vital force (the ojas) is drawn from the mother and to the developing child. The father donates the hard parts of the body to the developing fetus whereas the soft parts come from the mother. Just as with Aristotle, the Sushruta Samhita compares the developing embryo to the clotting of milk into cheese. It claims that conditions of heat result in seven layers of skin being formed around the fetus, just as the creamy layers in cheese form from milk. One of the Upanishads known as the Garbhopanisaḍ states that the embryo is "like water in the first night, in seven nights it is like a bubble, at the end of half a month it becomes a ball. At the end of a month it is hardened, in two months the head is formed". The Indian medical tradition in the Ayurveda also has conceptions of embryology from antiquity. Then Dalhana, a medieval commentator on the Sushruta Samhita, also describes embryological development. Dalhana claims that in the first month, the fetus has a jelly-like form, whereas cold and heat cause a change to hardness during the second month. Limb differentiation occurs in the third to four months and intelligence even later.

Ancient Greece

Pre-Socratic philosophers
Many pre-Socratic philosophers are recorded as having opinions on different aspects of embryology, although there is some bias in the description of their views in later authors such as Aristotle. According to Empedocles (whose views are described by Plutarch in the 1st century AD), who lived in the 5th century BC, the embryo derives and receives its blood from four vessels in all; two arteries and two veins. He also held sinews as originating from equal mixtures of earth and air. He further said men begin to form within the first month and are finished within fifty days. Asclepiades agreed that men are formed within fifty days, but he believed that women took a full two months to be fully knit. One observation, variously attributed to either Anaxagoras of Clazomenae or Alcmaeon of Croton, says that the milk produced by mammals is analogous to the white of fowl egg. Diogenes of Apollonia claimed that a mass of flesh forms first, only then followed by the development of bone and nerves. Diogenes was able to recognize that the placenta was a nutritional source for the growing fetus. He further claimed that the development of males took four months, but that the development of females took five months. He did not think the embryo was alive. Alcmaeon also made some contributions, and he is the first person being reported to have practiced dissection. One idea which lasted for a long time, first claimed by Parmenides, was that there was a connection between the right side of the body and the male embryo, and between the left side of the body and the female embryo. According to Democritus and Epicurus, the fetus is nourished at the mouth inside the mother and there are comparable teats that supply this nourishment within the mother's body to the fetus. Discussion on various views regarding how long it takes for specific parts of the embryo to form appear in an anonymous document known as the Nutriment.

Greek discussions on embryology often tried to answer several questions. One question regarded whether only the male had a seed which developed into the embryo within the female womb, or whether both the male and the female had a seed that made a contribution to the developing embryo. The difficulty that one-seed theorists confronted was to explain the maternal resemblance of the progeny. One issue that two-seed theorists confronted was why the female seed was needed if the male already had a seed. One common solution to this problem was to assert that the female seed was either inferior or inactive. Another question to answer was the origin of the seed. One theory to answer this, known as the encephalomyelogenic theory, stated that the seed originated from the brain or and/or bone marrow. Later came pangenesis, which asserted the seed was drawn from the whole body in order to explain the general resemblance in the body of the offspring. Later on hematogenous theory developed which asserted that the seed was drawn from the blood. A third question regarded how or in what form the progeny existed in the seed prior to developing into an embryo and a fetus. According to preformationists, the body of the progeny already existed in a pre-existing but undeveloped form in the seed. Three variants of preformationism were homoiomerous preformationism, anhomoiomerous preformationism, and homuncular preformationism. According to the first, the homoiomerous parts of the body (e.g. humors, bone) already exist pre-formed in the seed. The second held that it was the anhomoiomerous parts that were pre-formed. Finally, the third view held that the whole was already a unified organic thing. Preformationism was not the only view. According to epigenesists, parts of the embryo successively form after conception takes place.

Hippocrates
Some of the most well-known early ideas on embryology come from Hippocrates and the Hippocratic Corpus, where discussion on the embryo is usually given in the context of discussing obstetrics (pregnancy and childbirth). Some of the most relevant Hippocratic texts on embryology include the Regimen on Acute Diseases, On Semen, and On the Development of the Child. Hippocrates claimed that the development of the embryo is put into motion by fire and that nourishment comes from food and breath introduced into the mother. An outer layer of the embryo solidifies, and the fire within consumes humidity which makes way for development of bone and nerve. The fire in the innermost part becomes the belly and air channels are developed in order to route nourishment to it. The enclosed fire also helps form veins and allows for circulation. In this description, Hippocrates aims at describing the causes of development rather than describing what develops. Hippocrates also develops views similar to preformationism, where he claims that all parts of the embryo simultaneously develop. Hippocrates also believed that maternal blood nourishes the embryo. This blood flows and coagulates to help form the flesh of the fetus. This idea was derived from the observation that menstrual blood ceases during pregnancy, which Hippocrates took to imply that it was being redirected to fetal development. Hippocrates also claimed that the flesh differentiates into different organs of the body, and Hippocrates saw as analogous an experiment where  a mixture of substances placed into water will differentiate into different layers. Comparing the seed to the embryo, Hippocrates further compared the stalk to the umbilical cord.

Aristotle

Some embryological discussion appears in the writings of Aristotle's predecessor Plato, especially in his Timaeus. One of his views were that the bone marrow acted as the seedbed, and that the soul itself was the seed out of which the embryo developed, though he did not explain how this development proceeded. Scholars also continue to debate the views he held on various other aspects of embryology. However, a much more voluminous discussion on the subject comes from the writings of Aristotle, especially as appears in his On the Generation of Animals. Some ideas related to embryology also appear in his History of Animals, On the Parts of Animals, On Respiration, and On the Motion of Animals. Means by which we know Aristotle studied embryology, and most likely his predecessors as well, was through studying developing embryos taken out from animals as well as aborted and miscarried human embryos. Aristotle believed that the female supplied the matter for the development of the embryo, formed from the menstrual blood whereas the semen that comes from the male shapes that matter. Aristotle's belief that both the male and female made a contribution to the actual fetus goes against some prior beliefs. According to Aeschylus and some Egyptian traditions, the fetus solely develops from the male contribution and that the female womb simply nourishes this growing fetus. On the other hand, the Melanesians held that the fetus is solely a product of the female contribution. Aristotle did not believe there were any external influences on the development of the embryo. Against Hippocrates, Aristotle believed that new parts of the body developed over time rather than all forming immediately and developing from then on. He also considered whether each new part derives from a previously formed part or develops independently of any previously formed part. On the basis that different parts of the body do not resemble each other, he decided in favor of the latter view. He also described development of fetal parts in terms of mechanical and automatic processes. In terms of the development of the embryo, he says it begins in a liquid-like state as the material secreted by the female combines with the semen of the male, and then the surface begins to solidify as it interacts with processes of heating and cooling. The first part of the body to differentiate is the heart, which Aristotle and many of his contemporaries believed was the location of reason and thinking. Aristotle claimed that vessels join to the uterus in order to supply nourishment to the developing fetus. Some of the most solid parts of the fetus cool and, as they lose moisture to heat, turn into nails, horns, hoofs, beaks, etc. Internal heat dries away moisture and forms sinews and bones and the skin results from drying of the flesh. Aristotle also describes the development of birds in eggs at length. He further described embryonic development in dolphins, some sharks, and many other animals. Aristotle singularly wrote more on embryology than any other pre-modern author, and his influence on the subsequent discussion on the subject for many centuries was immense, introducing into the subject forms of classification, a comparative method from various animals, discussion of the development of sexual characteristics, compared the development of the embryo to mechanistic processes, and so forth.

Later Greek embryology
Reportedly, some Stoics claimed that most parts of the body formed at once during embryological development. Some Epicureans claimed that the fetus is nourished by either the amniotic fluid or the blood, and that both male and female supply material to the development of the fetus. According to the writings of Tertullian, Herophilus in the 4th century BC described the ovaries and Fallopian tubes (but not past what was already described by Aristotle) and also dissected some embryos. One advance Herophilus made, against the conceptions of other individuals such as Aristotle, was that the brain was the center of intellect rather than the heart. Though not a part of Greek tradition, in Job 10, the formation of the embryo is likened to the curdling of milk into cheese, as described by Aristotle. Whereas Needham sees this statement in Job as part of the Aristotelian tradition, others see it as evidence that the milk analogy predates the Aristotelian Greek tradition and originates in Jewish circles. In addition, the Wisdom of Solomon (7:2) also has the embryo formed from menstrual blood. Soranus of Ephesus also wrote texts on embryology which went into use for a long time. Some rabbinic texts discuss the embryology of a female Greek writer named Cleopatra, a contemporary of Galen and Soranus, who was said to have claimed that the male fetus is complete in 41 days whereas the female fetus is complete in 81 days. Various other texts of less importance also appear and describe various aspects of embryology, though without making much progress from Aristotle. Plutarch has a chapter in one of his works titled "Whether was before, the hen or egg?" Discussion on embryological tradition also appears in many Neoplatonic traditions.

Next to Aristotle, the most impactful and important Greek writer on biology was Galen of Pergamum, and his works were transmitted throughout the Middle Ages. Galen discusses his understanding of embryology in two of his texts, those being his On the Natural Faculties and his On the Formation of the Foetus. There is an additional text spuriously attributed to Galen known as On the Question of whether the Embryo is an Animal. Galen described embryological development in four stages. In the first stage, the semen predominates. In the second stage, the embryo is filled with blood. In the third stage, the main outlines of the organs have developed but various other parts remain undeveloped. In the fourth stage, formation is complete and has reached a stage where we can call it a child. Galen described processes that played a role in furthering development of the embryo such as warming, drying, cooling, and combinations thereof. As this development plays out, the form of life of the embryo also moves from that like a plant to that of an animal (where the analogy between the root and umbilical cord is made). Galen claimed that the embryo forms from menstrual blood, by which his experimental analogy was that when you cut the vein of an animal and allow blood to flow out and into some mildly heated water, a sort of coagulation can be observed. He gave detailed descriptions of the position of the umbilical cord relative to other veins.

Patristics

The question of embryology is discussed among a number of patristic authors, largely in terms of theological questions such as whether the fetus has value and/or when it begins to have value. (Although a number of Christian authors continued the classical discussions on the description of the development of the embryo, such as Jacob of Serugh. Passing reference to the embryo also appears in the eighth hymn of Ephrem the Syrian's Paradise Hymns.) Many patristic treatments of embryology continued in the stream of Greek tradition. The earlier Greek and Roman view that it was not was reversed and all pre-natal infanticide was condemned. Tertullian held that the soul was present from the moment of conception. The Quinisext Council concluded that "we pay no attention to the subtle division as to whether the foetus is formed or unformed". In this time, then, the Roman practice of child exposure came to an end, where unwanted yet birthed children, usually females, were discarded by the parents to die. Other more liberal traditions followed Augustine, who instead viewed that the animation of life began on the 40th day in males and the 80th day in females but not prior. Before the 40th day for men and 80th day for women, the embryo was referred to as the embryo informatus, and after this period was reached, it was referred to as the embryo formatus. The notion originating from the Greeks that the male embryo developed faster remained in various authors until it was experimentally disproven by Andreas Ottomar Goelicke in 1723.

Various patristic literature from backgrounds ranging from Nestorian, Monophysite and Chalcedonian discuss and choose between three different conceptions on the relation between the soul and the embryo. According to one view, the soul pre-exists and enters the embryo at the moment of conception (prohyparxis). According to a second view, the soul enters into existence at the moment of conception (synhyparxis). In a third view, the soul enters into the body after it has been formed (methyparxis). The first option was proposed by Origen, but was increasingly rejected after the fourth century. On the other hand, the other two options were equally accepted after this point. The second position appears to have been proposed as a response to Origen's notion of a pre-existing soul. After the sixth century, the second position was also increasingly seen as Origenist and so rejected on those grounds. The writings of Origen were condemned during the Second Origenist Crises in 553. Those defending prohyparxis usually appealed to the Platonic notion of an eternally moving soul. Those defending the second position also appealed to Plato but rejected his notion on the eternality of the soul. Finally, those appealing to the third position appealed both to Aristotle and scripture. Aristotelian notions included the progression of the development of the soul, from an initial plant-like soul, to a sensitive soul found in animals and allows for movement and perception, and finally the formation of a rational soul which can only be found in the fully-formed human. Furthermore, some scriptural texts were seen as implying the formation of the soul temporally after the formation of the body (namely Genesis 2:7; Exodus 21:22-23; Zachariah 12:1). In the De hominis opificio of Gregory of Nyssa, Aristotle's triparitate notion of the soul was accepted. Gregory also held that the rational soul was present at conception. Theodoret argued based on Genesis 2:7 and Exodus 21:22 that the embryo is only ensouled after the body is fully formed. Based on Exodus 21:22 and Zachariah 12:1, the Monophysite Philoxenus of Mabbug claimed that the soul was created in the body forty days after conception. In his De opificio mundi, the Christian philosopher John Philoponus claimed that the soul is formed after the body. Later still, the author Leontius held that the body and soul were created simultaneously, though it is also possible he held that the soul pre-existed the body.

Some Monophysites and Chalcedonians seemed to have been compelled into accepting synhyparxis in the case of Jesus because of their view that the incarnation of Christ resulted in both one hypostasis and one nature, whereas some Nestorians claimed that Christ, like us, must have had his soul formed after the formation of his body because, per Hebrews 4:15, Christ was like us in all ways but sin. (On the other hand, Leontinus dismissed the relevance of Hebrews 4:15 on the basis that Christ differed from us not only in sinfulness but also conception without semen, making synhyparxis another of Christ's supernatural feats.) They felt comfortable holding this view, under their belief that the human nature of Jesus was separate from the divine hypostasis. Some Nestorians still wondered, however, if the body united with the soul in the moment the soul was created or whether it came with it only later. The Syriac author Babai argued for the former on the basis that the latter was hardly better than adoptionism. Maximus the Confessor ridiculed the Aristotelian notion of the development of the soul on the basis that it would make humans parents of both plants and animals. He held to synhyparxis and regarded the other two positions both as incorrect extremes. After the 7th century, Chalcedonian discussion on embryology is slight and the few works that touch on the topic support synhyparxis. But debate among other groups remains lively, still divided on similar sectarian grounds. The patriarch Timothy I argued that the Word first united with the body, and only later with the soul. He cited John 1:1, claiming on its basis that the Word became flesh first, not a human being first. Then, Jacob of Edessa rejected prohyparxis because Origen had defended it and methyparxis because he believed that it made the soul ontologically inferior and as only being made for the body. Then, Moses Bar Kepha claimed, for Christological reasons as a Monophysite, that only synhyparxis was acceptable. He claimed that Genesis 2:7 has no temporal sequence and that Exodus 21:22 regards the formation of the body and not the soul and so is not relevant. To argue against methyparxis, he reasoned that body and soul are both present at death and, because what is at the end must correspond to what is also at the beginning, conception must also have body and soul together.

Embryology in Jewish tradition

Many Jewish authors also discussed notions of embryology, especially as they appear in the Talmud. Much of the embryological data in the Talmud is part of discussions related to the impurity of the mother after childbirth. The embryo was described as the peri habbetten (fruit of the body) and it developed through various stages: (1) golem (formless and rolled-up) (2) shefir meruqqam (embroidered foetus) (3) ubbar (something carried) (4) walad (child) (5) walad shel qayama (viable child) (6) ben she-kallu khadashaw (child whose months have been completed). Some mystical notions regarding embryology appear in the Sefer Yetzirah. The text in the Book of Job relating to the fetus forming by analogy to the curdling of milk into cheese was cited in the Babylonian Talmud and in even greater detail in the Midrash: "When the womb of the woman is full of retained blood which then comes forth to the area of her menstruation, by the will of the Lord comes a drop of white-matter which falls into it: at once the embryo is created. [This can be] compared to milk being put in a vessel: if you add to it some lab-ferment [drug or herb], it coagulates and stands still; if not, the milk remains liquid." The Talmud sages held that there were two seeds that participated in the formation of the embryo, one from the male and one from the female, and that their relative proportions determine whether that develops into a male or a female. In the Tractate Nidda, the mother was said to provide a "red-seed" which allows for the development of skin, flesh, hair, and the black part of the eye (pupil), whereas the father provides the "white-seed" which forms the bones, nerves, brain, and the white part of the eye. And finally, God himself was thought to provide the spirit and soul, facial expressions, capacity for hearing and vision, movement, comprehension, and intelligence. Not all strands of Jewish tradition accepted that both the male and female contributed parts to the formation of the fetus. The 13th century medieval commentator Nachmanides, for example, rejected the female contribution. In Tractate Hullin in the Talmud, whether the organs of the child resemble more closely those of the mother or father is said to depend on which one contribute more matter to the embryo depending on the child. Rabbi Ishmael and other sages are said to have disagreed on one matter: they agreed that the male embryo developed on the 41st day, but disagreed on whether this was the case for the female embryo. Some believed that the female embryo was complete later, whereas others held that they were finished at the same time. The only ancient Jewish authors who associated abortion with homicide were Josephus and Philo of Alexandria in the 1st century. Some Talmudic texts discuss magical influences on the development of the embryo, such as one text which claims that if one sleeps on a bed that is pointed to the north–south will have a male child. According to Nachmanides, a child born of a cold drop of semen will be foolish, one born from a warm drop of semen will be passionate and irascible, and one born from a semen drop of medium temperature will be clever and level-headed. Some Talmudic discussions follow from Hippocratic claims that a child born on the eighth month could not survive, whereas others follow Aristotle in claiming that they sometimes could survive. One text even says that survival is possible on the seventh month, but not the eighth. Talmudic embryology, in various aspects, follows Greek discourses especially from Hippocrates and Aristotle, but in other areas, makes novel statements on the subject.

Embryology in the Islamic tradition

Passing reference to embryological notions also appear in the Qur'an (22:5), where the development of the embryo proceeds in four stages from drop, to a blood clot, to a partially developed stage, to a fully developed child. The notion of clay turning into flesh is seen by some as analogous to a text by Theodoret that describes the same process. The four stages of development in the Qur'an are similar to the four stages of embryological development as described by Galen. In the early 6th century, Sergius of Reshaina devoted himself to the translation of Greek medical texts into Syriac and became the most important figure in this process. Included in his translations were the relevant embryological texts of Galen. Anurshirvan founded a medical school in the southern Mesopotamian city of Gundeshapur, known as the Academy of Gondishapur, which also acted as a medium for the transmission, reception, and development of notions from Greek medicine. These factors helped the transmission of Greek notions on embryology, such as found in Galen, to enter into the Arabian milieu. Very similar embryonic descriptions also appear in the Syriac Jacob of Serugh's letter to the Archdeacon Mar Julian.

Embryological discussions also appear in the Islamic legal tradition.

See also

 Abortion
 Caspar Friedrich Wolff
 Embryogenesis
 Embryonic differentiation waves
 Embryology of digestive system and the body cavities
 French flag model
 Morphogen
 Ontogeny
 Recapitulation theory

References

Citations

Sources 
 "Germ layer." Encyclopædia Britannica. 2009. Encyclopædia Britannica Online. 6 Nov. 2009 <https://www.britannica.com/EBchecked/topic/230597/germ-layer>.
 Welton, John. “| Circle Surrogacy". Circle Surrogacy, Full Service, Worldwide Surrogate-Parenting Agency, www.circlesurrogacy.com/about/what-is-surrogacy.

Further reading
 
 Scott F. Gilbert. Developmental Biology. Sinauer, 2003. .
 Lewis Wolpert. Principles of Development. Oxford University Press, 2006. .
  (click here for more information)

External links

 Online course in embryology
 Indiana University's Human Embryology Animations 
 UNSW Embryology Large resource of information and media.
 What is a human admixed embryo?
 Definition of embryo according to Webster